Robert Alan Eustace (born 1956/1957) is an American computer scientist who served as Senior Vice President of Engineering at Google until retiring in 2015. On October 24, 2014, he made a free-fall jump from the stratosphere, breaking Felix Baumgartner's world record.

Early years
The son of a Martin Marietta engineer, Eustace grew up in Pine Hills, Florida, then a working-class suburb of Orlando, where small ranch houses had been built for employees of the Martin Marietta Corporation. After graduating from Maynard Evans High School in 1974, he received a debate scholarship from Valencia College and attended it for a year before transferring to Florida Technological University—now known as the University of Central Florida—to major in mechanical engineering.

As a university student, Eustace worked part-time selling popcorn and ice cream in Fantasyland and working on the monorail at Walt Disney World. However, after taking a class on computer science, he decided to switch majors and ended up completing three academic degrees in the field, including a doctorate in 1984.

Professional career
After graduation, Eustace worked briefly for Silicon Solutions, a startup in Silicon Valley, before joining Digital, Compaq and then HP's Western Research Laboratory, where he worked 15 years on pocket computing, chip multi-processors, power and energy management, internet performance, and frequency and voltage scaling. In the mid-1990s, he worked with Amitabh Srivastava on ATOM, a binary-code instrumentation system that forms the basis for a wide variety of program analysis and computer architecture analysis tools.

These tools had a profound influence on the EV5, EV6 and EV7 chip designs.

Eustace was appointed head of the laboratory in 1999, but left it three years later to join Google, then a four-year-old startup. At Google, he worked as Senior Vice President of Engineering until he retired from that section of Google on March 27, 2015.

Eustace is currently Technical Advisor at Opener Aerospace, sometimes giving interviews about their electric VTOL aircraft, the Opener BlackFly.

In the course of his professional career, Eustace co-authored nine publications and appeared as co-inventor in ten patents.

Stratosphere jump

In 2011, Eustace decided to pursue a stratosphere jump and met with Taber MacCallum, one of the founding members of Biosphere 2, to begin preparations for the project. Over the next three years, the Paragon Space Development technical team designed and redesigned many of the components of his parachute and life-support system. The Paragon team integrated systems for the Stratospheric Explorer mission code named StratEx.

On October 24, 2014, Eustace made a jump from the stratosphere, breaking Felix Baumgartner's 2012 world record. The launch-point for his jump was from an abandoned runway in Roswell, New Mexico, where he began his gas balloon-powered ascent early that morning. The balloon used for the feat was manufactured by the Balloon Facility of the Tata Institute of Fundamental Research, Hyderabad, India. Eustace in his pressure suit hung tethered under the balloon, without the kind of capsule used by Felix Baumgartner. Eustace started his fall by using an explosive device to separate from the helium balloon.

However, because Eustace's jump involved a drogue parachute, while Baumgartner's did not, their vertical speed and free-fall distance records remain in different categories.

Unlike Baumgartner, Eustace, a twin-engine jet pilot, was not widely known as a daredevil prior to his jump.

Eustace's world record jump was featured in two episodes of STEM in 30, a television show geared towards middle-school students by the National Air and Space Museum.

See also
Space diving
Yevgeni Andreyev
Felix Baumgartner
Charles "Nish" Bruce
Michel Fournier
Joseph Kittinger
Nick Piantanida
Cheryl Stearns
Steve Truglia
Olav Zipser
Victor Prather

References

Further reading
 Leidich, Jared The Wild Black Yonder, The Inside Story of the Secret Trip to the Edge of Earth's Atmosphere for the Highest Balloon Flight and Skydive of All Time. Stratospheric Publishing, 2016.

External links

"I leapt from the stratosphere. Here’s how I did it" (TED Talk, March 2015)
"Alan Eustace Jumps from Stratosphere Breaking Felix Baumgartner's Record" (John Markoff, The New York Times, October 24, 2014)
  movie about record setting space jump 14 Minutes from Earth (2016)

 
 
 
 

1950s births
American computer scientists
American skydivers
Google employees
Living people
People from Orange County, Florida
University of Central Florida alumni
Year of birth missing (living people)
Space diving
Flight altitude record holders
American aviation record holders
Laureus World Sports Awards winners